Wilsona is a former settlement in Los Angeles County, California. It lay at an elevation of 2726 feet (831 m). It still appeared on USGS maps as of 1935.

References

Former settlements in Los Angeles County, California
Former populated places in California